The following highways are numbered 879:

United States